The Capilano Rugby Football Club is a Canadian rugby union team based in West Vancouver, British Columbia. The Capilano Rugby Football Club currently play in the British Columbia Premiership and have won the BC Premier Championship three times.

History

The Capilano Rugby Football Club is the product of the amalgamation of two rugby clubs, the North Shore All-Blacks and the West Vancouver Barbarians, in 1969. Before the merger the North Shore All-Blacks were dominant in the 1930s capturing the British Columbia championship three years in a row from 1933 to 1935 and again in 1937, 1948, and 1955. The Capilanos continue to be a strong contender in the modern era winning three championships of their own in 2004 and 2005. Most recently, the Capilanos defeated James Bay Athletic Association 22-21 in the 2011-12 BC Premiership final to win their third provincial championship as the Capilano Rugby Football Club.

Facilities

In 1982 a deal was struck with West Vancouver to designate Klahanie Park the home of North Shore Rugby and continues to be the home ground of the Capilano RFC.

Titles

Rounsefell Cup: 3
2004, 2005, 2012

Club Presidents

1969 – 1971 Bill Ewing
1971 – 1975 Bucky Ellison
1975 – 1977 Jeremy Dalton
1977 – 1979 Kevin Davies
1979 – 1983 Robin Dyke
1983 – 1984 Eric Cable
1984 – 1987 Iain Sellers
1987 – 1991 Tony Scott
1991 – 1994 John Olmstead
1994 – 1996 Eric Carlson
1996 – 1999 Mark Slay
1999 – 2002 Tony Scott
2002 – 2006 Alan Snowden
2006 – 2009 Steve Cook
2009 – 2014 Ken Robinson
2014 – 2016 Kes Kasha
2016 – Present Nick Belmar

Honorary Life Members
 
George Wilson
Bill Duncan
Dick Hallaway
Bob Leevers
Alex Mahood
Bucky Ellison
Jim Morris
Brian Seed
Bob Spray
Jeremy Dalton
Kevin Davies
Gary Lynas
Robin Dyke
Ozzie Gjerdalen
Denny Maynard
Glyn Jones
Iain Sellars
Tony Scott
Noel Larkin
Dean Massie
Alan Codyre
Roger Hatch
Bob Michael
Mark Slay
Tim Murdy
Maurice Michaud
Paul Timperley
Bill Ewing
Eric Carlson
Alan Snowden
Steve Cook
Bob Bowman
Ken Robinson

References

External links
Official Website

Rugby union teams in British Columbia
West Vancouver

fr:British Columbia Rugby Union